Jacques Bergerac (26 May 1927 – 15 June 2014) was a French actor and businessman.

Life and career
Jacques Bergerac was born in 1927 in Biarritz, France, the son of Alice (Romatet) and Charles Bergerac.

Bergerac was a law student when he met a vacationing Ginger Rogers in France. She got him a screen test at the Metro-Goldwyn-Mayer studios that led to their appearing together in Twist of Fate (1954) (also known as Beautiful Stranger). He then appeared as Armand Duval in a television production of Camille for Kraft Television Theatre, opposite Signe Hasso. He played the Comte de Provence in Jean Delannoy's film Marie Antoinette Queen of France. 

In Strange Intruder (1956), he shared the screen with Edmund Purdom and Ida Lupino and in Les Girls (1957), he played the second male lead. He also appeared in Gigi (1958), Thunder in the Sun (1959), the cult horror film The Hypnotic Eye (1960) and A Global Affair (1964). In 1957, he received the Golden Globe Award for Foreign Newcomer.

He appeared in a few more films and on television in The Millionaire, Batman, 77 Sunset Strip, Alfred Hitchcock Presents (three episodes), The Lucy Show, Get Smart, The Dick Van Dyke Show and Perry Mason (Season 7, Episode 19). His last appearance was on an episode of The Doris Day Show in 1969, after which he left show business and became the head of Revlon's Paris office and of the Perfumes Balmain company. His younger brother Michel became CEO of Revlon six years later.

He also managed the rugby club Biarritz Olympique from 1980 until 1981.

Personal life
Bergerac married screen star Ginger Rogers in February 1953, and they divorced in July 1957. In June 1959, he married actress Dorothy Malone in Hong Kong, where she was on location for her 1960 film The Last Voyage. They had daughters Mimi and Diane together, and divorced in December 1964.

He died on 15 June 2014 at his home in Anglet, Pyrénées-Atlantiques, France.

Filmography

References

External links
 
 Article about Jacques and Michel Bergerac, people.com; accessed 14 December 2014. 

1927 births
2014 deaths
People from Biarritz
Best Foreign Newcomer Golden Globe winners
French male film actors
French male television actors
French businesspeople
French business executives